Idimuzhikkal or Chelembra is a town in Malappuram district, Kerala, India. Chelembra is the Panchayath (One of the elementary governmental ruling systems in India) and Idimuzhikal is the capital of this Panchayath. Chelembra grama panchayat in the district.

Location
Idimuzhikkal town is technically in Malappuram district but it is considered an extension of the Ramanattukara town of Kozhikode district. It is bordered by Feroke, Pallikkal, Thenjipalam, Vallikunnu, Kondotty and Kadalundi towns. The National Highway 17 transverses this township at Idimuzhikal and Kakkanchery  which are three kilometers apart.

Proposed Vallikunnu Municipality
The proposed Vallikunnu Municipality comprises:
Vallikunnu panchayat
Tenhipalam panchayat
Chelembra panchayat

Total Area: 77.18 km2

Total Population (1991 Census): 108,792

History
One of the earliest mention of Chelembra comes from Logans's Malabar manual (P.649).  As per this document, Chelembra came under Ramnad as a territory and acknowledged Zamorin as direct ruler.

It is also believed that  Chelembra was ruled by local landlords known as Elancheeri Manazhi Moosad who reside at Elancheeri Illam, Perumannassery (Perunneeri) and their "Samantha" (servants) Nambeesans of Thiruvangattu. Thiruvangattu Shiva Temple is an important historic location in this Panchayat. The Embranthiris of Neelamana Illam also were servile to Elancheeri Moosad and assisted them in the administration of the village.

It's believed that these Neelamana Embranthiris were brought to Chelembra by the Manazhi Moosad from the northern districts of Kerala to take care of the rituals and administration of the temples of this village. The Elancheeri Sree Sankara Narayana Kshetram is believed to be constructed for the exclusive use of the members of the Manazhi Family, but later on were given to the public by the Manazhi Moosad. Adv. Anil Moosad is the present lord of the region.

During the time of his father Manazhi Sreedharan Moosad, the Sankara Narayana Temple administration was entrusted with a committee of devotees which was led by Karuthedath Raman Nambeesan, Vasuthodi Neelakantan Nambeesan, Chandran Appat, P P  Balakrishnan Master, Radhakrishna Menon and Nellikkode Dasan.

Economy
Idimuzhikkal is one of the main commercial centers of Chelembra.  It is also the capital town where the Panchayath office and Village office is located.  The economy is mainly agrarian and small business oriented. Eurospin Industries, one of the main industries in Chelembra has stopped operation due to labour strikes. The Kinfra industrial facility is situated in this village which started in early 200s.

Chelembra has witnessed a building boom in recent years, along the sides of two National Highways and a bypass road. This is particularly evident in the number of shopping complexes built in recent years. Chelembra is developing fast with the development of KINFRA industrial park at Kakkanchery by the Kerala Government. This is the first of its kind in the state. Other planned projects include the Cyber park at Ramanattukara. Close proximity to Calicut International Airport, the University of Calicut and two major national highways speeds the development of Chelembra.

Traditional Weavers
Once Idimuzhikkal was known for the traditional weavers of Idimuzhikkal Theru. They spin cotton yarn from the fibre and then made cotton towels and cloth from this yarn. The cotton face towels known locally as "thorthu" was sold throughout the area and in the nearby cities, Kozhikode. The traditional weavers of Idimuzhikkal belonged to a particular community known as Shaliya, Chettiyar, or Padma Shaliya. According to the caste hierarchical system of Kerala, this community was just below the Vishwakarma community of the Hindu religion. They too are a subdivision of the Vishwakarma community. They lived in small communes, called 'theru', and they worshipped Lord Ganapathy as their deity. There are 'theru' in different parts of the state.
The main source of income of Idimuzhikkal was from this traditional weaving industry. Some still continue with this profession.

Specially trained carpenters of this region make the weaving machinery, which is called 'thari'.

Politics
People of Chelembra is active in politics also, perhaps Indian Muslim League will be the party which has the largest number of  registered members, followed closely by Indian National Congress. Communist (Marxist)Party of India, BJP and other such socio-political parties are also alive here.

One of the early socio-political activity is linked to the road development in Kolakkuth area. The villagers under the leadership of Unnikrishnan Nair, Appukkutty Master, Kalliyil Raman Nair, R V Govindan Nair, Ratnakaran Nair, Andiseery Narayanan, Amdissery Narayanan Master, Kalliyil Narayanan Nair and Nandillath Rajan formed a committee for development of Idimuzhikkal- Agrasala road. The local landlords were not willing to part with their land for development of the road. This led to conflict and the villagers jointly razed the wall of one of the landlords enabling road development. This led to a criminal- civil proceedings which lasted several years. This road development led to subsequent overall development of the region.

Important Landmarks
There are some prestigious educational institutions in Chelembra- Bhavan's Vidyashram located at Idimuzhikkal, Devaki Amma college of Pharmacy and Devaki Amma Memorial Guruvayoorappan College of Architecture, Narayanan Nair Memorial Higher Secondary School, Subramanya Vilasam Aided Upper Primary School, Alikkutty Moulavi Memorial Upper Primary School, Kolakattuchakli UP School, Perunthodippadam UP School etc. are some of them. Narayanan Nair School was established in 1976 at Pulliparamba in Chelembra.

Thiruvangat Siva temple, Elannummel Shiva temple, Perumannassery Sankaranarayana temple, Subramannya Swami temple, Theru Maha Ganapathi temple, Ayyappa Bhajana Madom, Idimuzhikkal, Chelooppadam Mosque, Elannummal Mosque, Kuroangoth Mosque, Perunneeri Mosque, Panayappuram juma Masjid etc. are a few of the places of worship in Chelembra. Another noted places of worship include Pullancheeri Kavu, Panengal Kavu, Pullipparambu Bhajanamadom etc.

Chelembra is the first Panchayath in Kerala which achieved 100% computer literacy by implementing the Akshaya programme successfully. Chelembra received the state award called "Nirmal Award" for the best Panchayath in Kerala.

Darul Irshad Shariath College is situated on Kolakuth road.  Devaki Amma Training College and Narayanan Nair High School are also situated nearby.  Elannummel Shiva Temple at Kolakkatuchaly attracts many devotees.  Noorul Hudha school is at Muthirapparamba.

Culture
There are many temples and mosques in the panchayath of Chelembra. The common Hindu festivals include the several "utsavams" celebrated in small temples, during which "theyyam" and "thira" will be on display. 
Duff Muttu, Kolkali and Aravanamuttu are common folk arts of this locality among Muslim population.  There are many libraries attached to mosques giving a rich source of Islamic studies.  Most of the books are written in Arabi-Malayalam which is a version of the Malayalam language written in Arabic script.  People gather in mosques for the evening prayer and continue to sit there after the prayers discussing social and cultural issues.  Business and family issues are also sorted out during these evening meetings.

Education

There are several elementary/ upper primary schools including Chelembra ALPS, Elannummal AMLPS, Kolakattuchali ALPS, Perumthodipadam AMLPS, Pullinkunnu ALPS, Chelembra SVAUPS and Chelupadam AMMAMUPS. 
The highschool in this panchayath is NNMHS, Chelembra.

Chelembra is now becoming a noted education centre also. Bhavans have a CBSE higher secondary school, law college, teacher's training centre and a junior college. Another noted educational institution is Naarayanan Nair Memorial Institutions, Devaki Amma Colleges and Manhajur Rashad Islamic college affiliated to Darul Huda Islamic University Chemmad. There are BEd, DEd, MEd, colleges, Postgraduate Pharmacy colleges, Higher Secondary schools, College of Architecture and junior schools by this group. The Subrahmanya Vilasam Aided Upper Primary (SVAUP)School is one of the noted educational institution of this area. Mr. Thaikkoottathil Apputty was the manager of this school. After his death Mr. Subrahmanyan Thikkottathil took charge of the school. Another noted educational institution is The Chelooppadam UP School founded by Neelat Mohammed.

Public Health 
There is a health centre at Chelooppadam near the Poolappoyil area which caters to the needs of the local people. An ayurvedic health centre also is functioning at Kunool Valavu in the Ambalakkandi Parambu.

Transportation
Idimuzhikkal town connects to other parts of India through Feroke town.  National highway 66 passes through Idimuzhikkal and the northern stretch connects to Goa and Mumbai.  The southern stretch connects to Cochin and Trivandrum.   State Highway No.28 starts from Nilambur and connects to Ooty, Mysore and Bangalore through Highways.12,29 and 181.   The nearest airport is at Kozhikode.  The nearest major railway station is at Parappanangadi.

One of the earliest roads in Chelembra was Idimuzhikal- Cheloopadam- Kolakkuth road. This road is now part of the PWD road network.

Chelembra is close to Kadalundippuzha, which  allows access to water transportation extending all the way till Kozhikode and beyond.

The nearest airport is Calicut international airport which is around 10 kilometers away from Idimuzhikkal.

Industry

One of the earlier industries were the Chelembra Spinning mill where several thousand employees worked.   The company was closed in 1990s due to labour unrest.  Kakkanchery technopark (KINFRA) was later opened which has attracted several information technology and food technology companies.

Suburbs and Villages
 Chakkulangara, Kolakkattu Chali and Paingotoor
 Pulliparamba, Elannummal, Kolakkuth, Perunneeri aka Perumannassery
 Panayapuram, Chaliparambu, Perunthodipadam and Kuttippala
 Parayil Bazar, Chelooppadam and Kakkanchery. 
 Durga Nagar, Puliyasheri Vishnu Temple
 Kottappuram Road, Kohinoor, Thenhippalam
 Padikkal, Velimukku and Thalappara
 Chelupadam and Punchirivalavu
 Koonoolvalavu, Kattukuzhingara and Perumannasseri
 Natakassery, Pullipparamba and Kolakkuth
 Kolakkattuchaly, Kolakkuthu, Kandayipadam, Elannummel and Muthirapparamba
 Olipram pathinalu and Olipram Pathinanchu

Tourist Attraction
The village still retains its rustic beauty; 
several ponds, especially the Appat pond, along with tiny brooks that weave across the expanse of paddy fields, are the main attractions of this village. The village rest on the banks of branches of Kadalundi River which originates from Neelithode of Ramanattukara. The Kadalundi Bird Sanctuary spreads over a cluster of islands where the Kadalundipuzha River flows into the Arabian Sea. There are over a hundred varieties of native birds and around 60 varieties of migratory birds that come here in large numbers annually. Idimuzhikkal/Ramanattukara is the main town, Kakkanchery is another developing town; both situated by National Highway 17. Now the road-widening efforts initiated by the National Highways Authority have totally changed the facade of this town.

See also
 Kadalundi Bird Sanctuary
 Paruthippara
 Farook College
 Ramanattukara
 Vallikkunnu
 Feroke
 Chelari
 Tenhipalam
 Chelembra

References

External links

Cities and towns in Malappuram district
Parappanangadi area